Johannes Benk (27 July 1844, in Vienna – 12 March 1914, in Vienna) was an Austrian monumental sculptor.

Biography 

His father, János Benk (1814–1895), was a decorative sculptor and stonemason from Osijek. After completing his primary education, he studied with the sculptor, Franz Bauer, then went to Dresden, where he studied at the Academy of Fine Arts with Ernst Julius Hähnel. He participated in several competitions for monumental sculpture, gaining notice with his designs for statues of Wilhelm von Tegetthoff, Beethoven and the Empress Maria Theresa, although none of those designs were realized. In 1862, the Academy awarded him its Gundel-Prize for excellence.

A scholarship enabled him to study in Rome and Florence from 1870 to 1871. Upon returning, he opened a studio in his father's home. He soon became popular and attracted a notable patron; Baron Karl von Hasenauer. 

From 1872, he was a member of the Vienna Künstlerhaus and, from 1887, a member of  "Pensionsgesellschaft bildender Künstler", a charity for needy sculptors. In 1887, he was named a Knight in the Order of Franz Joseph and, the following year, was awarded the Order of the Iron Crown, third class.

After he died, his studio passed to his son. As part of a project to extend the Apollogasse, his son accepted a payment of 100,000 Krone, and the building was demolished.

In 1924, a street in Veinna's Hietzing district was named after him.

References

Further reading 
 
 Josef Bayer: . Gesellschaft für Vervielfältigende Kunst, 1894
 
 Benk, Johannes @ the Österreichisches Biographisches Lexikon ab 1815 
 Astrid Herold: "Der Bildhauer Johannes Benk (27.07.1844 Wien – 12.03.1914 Wien)". In: Das Deutschmeister-Denkmal (1906). Huldigung des Soldatentums zwischen ehrlichem Gedenken und politischer Propaganda. Thesis. University of Vienna, Wien 2012, pp. 33–38. – Online

External links 

 

1844 births
1914 deaths
Austrian sculptors
Academy of Fine Arts Vienna alumni
Recipients of the Order of Franz Joseph
Artists from Vienna